This is a list of lighthouses in Namibia.

Lighthouses

Gallery

See also
List of lighthouses in Angola (to the north)
List of lighthouses in South Africa (to the south)
 Lists of lighthouses and lightvessels

References

External links

Namibia

Lighthouses
Lighthouses